The International Cross Country Championships was an annual international competition in cross- country running. It was created in 1903 by the International Cross Country Union (ICCU) and it marked the first time that an annual international championships had been held for the sport.

It began its life as a contest between the four Home Nations of the United Kingdom. The event became increasingly international over its history, beginning with the admittance of the first non-UK country in 1907 (France), the addition of several other Continental European countries in the 1920s, and then the introduction of Tunisia in 1958 which saw an African team compete for the first time.

The championships featured only a senior men's race from 1903 to 1961, at which point an under-21s event was introduced. After some years as an unsanctioned competition, a women's race finally gained official acceptance in 1967.

The event lasted from 1903 to 1972 – at the 1971 ICCU Congress members decided to transfer organisation of the event to the International Amateur Athletics Federation (IAAF), a move which was finalised after the 1972 ICC Championships and led to the first IAAF World Cross Country Championships in 1973.

The International Cross Country Championships featured a number of running greats, including: Alfred Shrubb (the inaugural race winner) and Jean Bouin in its early years, Frank Sando who won twice, as well as Jack Holden and Alain Mimoun who both won the race a record four times, and then Franjo Mihalić, Gaston Roelants and David Bedford in its later years. American runner Doris Brown was dominant in the short history of the women's race, winning all but two of the official women's races.

Editions

Results

Men's individual results

Men's Team Results

Junior Men's Individual Results

Junior Men's Team Results

Women's Individual Results

Women's Team Results

References

External links
Athchamps results database (archived)
Historical results from Association of Road Racing Statisticians

 
Cross country running competitions
Cross International
Defunct athletics competitions
Recurring events disestablished in 1973
1973 disestablishments
Athletics team events
Recurring sporting events established in 1903